The 1909 Fordham Maroon football team was an American football team that represented Fordham University as an independent during the 1909 college football season. Fordham claims a 13–2–2 record, but Sports Reference LLC and College Football Data Warehouse (CFDW) list the team's record at 5–1–2. 

Howard Gargan was the coach for a second and final year, and Frank Gargan was the captain. The team played its home games at American League Park in the Washington Heights neighborhood of Manhattan.

Schedule
The following eight games are reported in Fordham's media guide, CFDW, Sports Reference LLC, and contemporaneous press coverage.

The following are eight additional games reported in the Fordham media guide.

References

Fordham
Fordham Rams football seasons
Fordham Maroon football